Stefan Reisch (born 29 November 1941) is a German former footballer who played as a midfielder during the 1960s and 1970s.

Early life
Reisch was born in Németkér, Hungary. As most of the Danube Swabians did after World War II, the Reisch family left their native Hungary. They had lived in a small village called Németkér, which means something like "German village". They were taken up in the town of Herrieden in the district of Ansbach. Reisch started his youth football in the local club TSV Herrieden. He later played for TSV Moorenbrunn and TSV Altenfurt before moving to the youth team of 1. FC Nürnberg.

Club career
Reisch began playing professionally in 1960 for the 1. FC Nürnberg. He played for the club for seven years and made over 150 appearances before joining Switzerland's Neuchâtel Xamax in 1967. In 1968, he signed for Belgian side Club Brugge where he played for two years before returning to Switzerland with Helmut Benthaus' successful FC Basel team. Soon after joining the club, he scored a goal in the 1970 Uhrencup Final, which Basel won 8–7 after penalties after a 5–5 at full time. He ended his professional career after the 1971–72 Nationalliga A season as Basel won the Swiss League Championship. In Basel he made a total of 40 appearances, scoring a total of six goals, 21 matches (two goals) in the league and cup, 13 in the European Cup and Coppa delle Alpi (one goal), the rest in test matches.

Summer 1972 saw him take up a player-manager's role at Kickers Würzburg, but he lasted just one season in charge. He was later player manager for ASV Neumarkt, Jahn Regensburg and for SpVgg Büchenbach and manager for various amateur teams such as SpVgg Ansbach und FC Amberg.

International career
Reisch was capped nine time for the West Germany national team between 1962 and 1964. He made his debut on 30 September 1962, in a 3–2 win over Yugoslavia in Zagreb and played his last game in a 2–2 draw with Scotland in Hanover, on 12 May 1964.

Honours
1. FC Nürnberg
 German football championship: 1961
 DFB-Pokal: 1961–62

Club Brugge
 Belgian Cup: 1970

FC Basel
 Swiss League: 1971–72
 Coppa delle Alpi: 1970
 Uhrencup: 1970

References

External links
 
 

1941 births
Living people
People from Tolna County
German footballers
Association football midfielders
Germany international footballers
Bundesliga players
1. FC Nürnberg players
Neuchâtel Xamax FCS players
Club Brugge KV players
FC Basel players
German football managers
FC Amberg managers
Würzburger Kickers managers
German expatriate footballers
German expatriate sportspeople in Switzerland
Expatriate footballers in Switzerland
German expatriate sportspeople in Belgium
Expatriate footballers in Belgium